The 1972 Sacramento State Hornets football team represented California State University, Sacramento as a member of the Far Western Conference (FWC) during the 1972 NCAA College Division football season. Led by 12th-year head coach Ray Clemons, Sacramento State compiled an overall record of 2–8 with a mark of 1–4 in conference play, tying for fifth place in the FWC. The team was outscored by its opponents 188 to 107 for the season. The Hornets played home games at Hornet Stadium in Sacramento, California.

Schedule

References

Sacramento State
Sacramento State Hornets football seasons
Sacramento State Hornets football